KRI Alamang (644) is a  of the Indonesian Navy. Commissioned in 2013, she is the fourth ship of her class.

Specifications
The vessel has a length of 44 meters, a draft of 8 meters, and a displacement of 238 tonnes with the maximum speed of 27 knots. She has a crew complement of 35, and is equipped with two Chinese-made C-705 missile launchers, a 30mm main gun, and two 20mm Denel Vektor GI-2 guns.

The ship costed Rp 73 billion (USD 6 million in 2013).

Service history
Alamang was commissioned by Minister of Defense Purnomo Yusgiantoro in Batam on 20 December 2013, alongside two patrol boats also built by Palindo. She is part of the Indonesian Navy's Western Fleet Command (Koarmabar).

In the Western Fleet Command, she patrolled the waters around Batam and the Singapore Strait, capturing vessels without documentation or smugglers. She also patrols the waters around the Natuna Islands, capturing one Vietnamese fishing vessel there in 2017.

References

2013 ships
Clurit-class fast attack craft